Torrewa is a townland in the 
civil parish of Templeport, County Cavan, Ireland. It lies in the Roman Catholic parish of Corlough and barony of Tullyhaw.

Geography

Torrewa is bounded on the west by Drumlaydan townland and on the east by Bellaleenan and Culliagh townlands. Its chief geographical feature is a spring well. Torrewa is traversed by minor roads and rural lanes. The townland covers 22 statute acres.

History

In medieval times the McGovern barony of Tullyhaw was divided into economic taxation areas called ballibetoes, from the Irish Baile Biataigh (Anglicized as 'Ballybetagh'), meaning 'A Provisioner's Town or Settlement'. The original purpose was to enable the farmer, who controlled the baile, to provide hospitality for those who needed it, such as poor people and travellers. The ballybetagh was further divided into townlands farmed by individual families who paid a tribute or tax to the head of the ballybetagh, who in turn paid a similar tribute to the clan chief. The steward of the ballybetagh would have been the secular equivalent of the erenagh in charge of church lands. There were seven ballibetoes in the parish of Templeport. Torrewa was located in the ballybetagh of Ballymackgonghan (Irish = Baile Mac Eochagain, meaning 'McEoghan's Town').

The 1836 Ordnance Survey Namebooks state- There is the remains of an old Danish fort on the eastern boundary of the townland and one middling farm house near the centre.

The Torrewa Valuation Office Field books are available for October 1839.

In 1841 the population of the townland was 15, being 9 males and 6 females. There were two houses in the townland, all were inhabited.

In 1851 the population of the townland was 7, being 3 males and 4 females, the reduction being due to the Great Famine (Ireland). There was one house in the townland and it was inhabited.

Griffith's Valuation of 1857 lists six landholders in the townland.

In 1861 the population of the townland was 7, being 2 males and 5 females. There was one house in the townland and it was inhabited.

In 1871 the population of the townland was 7, being 3 males and 4 females. There were two houses in the townland and all were inhabited.(page 296 of census)

In 1881 the population of the townland was 12, being 6 males and 6 females. There were two houses in the townland, all were inhabited.

In 1891 the population of the townland was 19, being 8 males and 11 females. There were two houses in the townland, all were inhabited.

In the 1901 census of Ireland, there are two families listed in the townland,
 and in the 1911 census of Ireland, there are two families listed in the townland.

Antiquities

 According to the 1930s Dúchas Folklore collection, Saint Patrick’s Holy Well in Bellaleenan was originally in Torrewa

References

External links
The IreAtlas Townland Data Base

Townlands of County Cavan